FC Panjsher Balkh is football club from Balkh, Tajikistan.

Club history
FC Panjshir was founded in 1973 under the name "Trud" during Soviet times.
In 1997, Panjshir made their debut in the Tajik League, the top division in Tajikistan, under the name "SKA-Panjshir".

From 1998 to 2003 the club use the name "Panjshir", during which they came runners-up to Regar-TadAZ in 2001. Panjshir were relegated from the Tajik League in 2003 and went on to play in the Tajikistan First League in 2005, 2009 and 2011. In 2012 Panjshir won the Tajikistan First League Dushanbe division earning promotion back to the Tajik League for 2013. During the 2013 season Panjshir only played 5 matches before withdrawing form the Championship, returning to the First League for the 2014 season.

On 23 January 2018, Panjshir appointed Alier Ashurmamadov as their manager.

On 21 August 2018, Panjshir appointed Rustam Khojayev as manager.

Names
?? : Trud
1997     : SKA-Panjshir
1998–2003: Panjshir
2005     : Mehnat
2009     : Panjshir
2011     : Rumi
2012–    : Panjshir

Domestic history

Panjshir withdrew from the league after 5 games

References

External links
 

Football clubs in Tajikistan